Indonesian Arabic is varieties of Arabic spoken in Indonesia. Arabic in Indonesia is generally spoken by descendants of Arabs and santri who study Arabic in Islamic boarding school or pesantren. This language generally has word interludes from local languages in Indonesia in its use according to the region where this language is spoken.

History
From a historical perspective, language and Arabic culture have been known since the arrival of Islam to Nusantara, that means long before Indonesian independence, Arabic was already known by indigenous people. If we trace the relationship between Arabic and Islam in the archipelago, the culture of Arabic has a great influence on people's lives and the culture of Islam in the Nusantara, for example in terms of the language used in everyday society.

The development of the Arabic language occurred due to the stopover of Arab trade caravans and Persians in Indonesia for a long period of time. It is known that Arabic language and literature are thought to have existed in this archipelago since the early 7th–8th centuries AD and began to develop rapidly in the 9th–12th centuries AD (this theory is supported by Hamka, Van Leur, and T.W. Arnod).

Usages
The Arabic language spoken in Indonesia is generally used by Arabs descent and the santri. This language is unique, namely the mixing of vocabulary in Arabic and Indonesian as well as other regional languages. This language is generally used in places of Islamic education or Islamic boarding schools and villages inhabited by people of Arab descent or called Kampung Arab.

Arabic in Indonesia is generally spoken by descendants of Arabs in Bogor (Empang and Cisarua), Surabaya (Ampel), Bangkalan (Kamal), Jakarta (Pekojan), Gresik, Pekalongan, Kediri, Pasuruan, Bondowoso as well as other Arab residential areas in Indonesia.

See also
Arab Indonesians
Arabic language

References

External links
Arabic Dictionary: Arabic - Indonesian - Indonesian - Arabic

Languages of Indonesia
Arabic language